Ishioka (written: 石岡) is a Japanese surname. Notable people with the surname include:

, Japanese alpine skier
, Japanese art director, costume designer and graphic designer
, Japanese film director and screenwriter
, Japanese baseball player
, Japanese mixed martial artist, kickboxer and karateka
, Japanese alpine skier

Japanese-language surnames